Sharon Blynn  is an American actress and cancer activist. She founded her "Bald is Beautiful" organization for ovarian cancer awareness, and to empower women to define their beauty and wholeness for themselves on their own terms, in sickness and in health.

Blynn is also known for portraying the Skrull character Soren in the Marvel Cinematic Universe.

Early life
Blynn grew up in Miami, and moved to New York City to attend college at Barnard College/Columbia University, graduating from Columbia University with the first-ever undergraduate B.A. in Ethnomusicology. After graduation, she worked as a marketing executive for Verve Records from 1994 to 2000.

Cancer activism
In 2000 she was diagnosed with ovarian cancer. After three years of treatment, Sharon has been in remission since 2003. Inspired by her own life and experience with ovarian cancer, Sharon founded an organisation called "Bald is Beautiful" in 2002. The main objective of the movement is to expand the existing social notions of beauty and femininity, and also ovarian cancer awareness programs. Sharon has remained bald since 2001 in order to publicly represent the message of her organization, and work within TV and film to put the image of a bald woman into mainstream consciousness and give women positive media references for how their bodies may change during treatment (and as women in general).

For the past 17 years, Sharon has been working relentlessly as a cancer activist. In November 2009, she spoke at the "Lo Que de Verdad Importa (What Really Matters)" program presented by the Madrid-based Además Organization. She was the host and interviewee for "The Whisper", a documentary about ovarian cancer which was aired on PBS in September 2010.

Acting career
Sharon's appearances and activities has attained wide media attention. As a result, she was selected to be a part of many fashion shows, TV shows, and films.

In film, Blynn is notable for her involvement in the 2019 Marvel Cinematic Universe films Captain Marvel and Spider-Man: Far From Home, where she portrayed Soren, a Skrull who is Talos' wife.

Awards and recognitions
Sharon was awarded the BraveHeart Women's Association Courage Award in 2011. She was previously awarded the Lilly Tartikoff/EIF Hope Award at the National Coalition for Cancer Survivorship’s 2010 Rays of Hope gala. Lifetime TV honored Sharon by selecting her as one of the "Remarkable Women" in their Every Woman Counts series.

Filmography

References

External links
 
 

Actresses from New York City
American film actresses
American stage actresses
American television actresses
Living people
American activists
21st-century American actresses
Year of birth missing (living people)